Muhammad Salim Qasmi Siddiqi (8 January 1926 — 14 April 2018) was an Indian Muslim scholar who co-founded the Darul Uloom Waqf in Deoband and served as its first rector. He was an alumnus of Darul Uloom Deoband. He received the fourth Shah Waliullah Award and was honoured with the Mark of Distinction from Egypt.

Biography
Muhammad Salim Qasmi was born on 8 January 1926 at Deoband into the Siddiqi family of Nanauta. He was the eldest son of Muhammad Tayyib Qasmi.

Qasmi graduated from Darul Uloom Deoband in 1948 where his teachers included Hussain Ahmed Madani, Izaz Ali Amrohi, Ibrahim Balyawi and Syed Fakhrul Hasan Moradabadi. He studied Mizan, a book of Arabic grammar with Ashraf Ali Thanwi.

He was appointed as a teacher at Darul Uloom Deoband in 1949.

In 1982, along with Anzar Shah Kashmiri, he co-founded Darul Uloom Waqf, Deoband and remained its chief rector.

Literary works
Qasmi's works include:
Mabaadi al Tarbiyat al Islami (Arabic)
Jaizah Tarjama Quran Karim
Taajdar e Arze Haram ka Paigham
Mardaan-e-Ghaazi
Ek Azeem Tarikhi Khidmat
Safar Nama Burma
Khutbat e Khatibul Islam (collection of his speeches) has been published in 5 volumes.

Positions held
Salim Qasmi held the following positions during his lifetime:
Chief Rector, Darul Uloom Waqf, Deoband
Vice-President, All India Muslim Personal Law Board
Member, Aligarh Muslim University Court.
Member of Advisory Board and Managing Committee, Darul Uloom Nadwatul Ulama.
Member of Advisory Board, Mazahir Uloom Waqf, Saharanpur.
Permanent Member of the Fiqh Council, Al-Azhar, Cairo
President, All India Muslim Majlis-e-Mushawarat (before two fractions of it finally united).
Patron, Kul Hind Rabta-e-Masajid.
Patron, Islamic Fiqh Academy, India.

Awards and recognition
Qasmi received the Nishan-e-Imtiyaz (Mark of Distinction) from the Government of Egypt for being a distinguished scholar of the Indian subcontinent. He was conferred with the fourth Shah Waliullah Award and the Imam Muhammad Qasim Nanautawi Award in 2014.

Death and legacy
Muhammad Salim Qasmi died on Saturday 14 April 2018 in Deoband, aged 92. Hujjatul Islam Academy held a 3 days international seminar in August 2018 on The Life and Achievements of Qasmi. His son Muhammad Sufyan Qasmi has been the rector of Darul Uloom Waqf, Deoband since 3 September 2014.
Jamiatul Qasim Darul Uloom Al-Islamiah organized a one-day seminar in collaboration with the Islamic Studies department of Jamia Millia Islamia on Qasmi's life and works. The seminar was held in the Ansari Auditorium of the Jamia Millia Islamia and was attended by Akhtarul Wasey.

References

1926 births
2018 deaths
Deobandis
Indian Sunni Muslim scholars of Islam
Darul Uloom Deoband alumni
Academic staff of Darul Uloom Deoband
Qasmi family
Burials at Mazar-e-Qasmi